The , officially the , is Japanese aerial lift line in Yuzawa, Niigata, operated by . The line runs in the town of the huge ski resort complex, but it also transports hikers in other seasons. It opened in 1991.

Basic data
System: Aerial tramway, 2 track cables and 2 haulage ropes
Cable length: 
Vertical interval: 
Maximum gradient: 31°07′
Operational speed: 5.0 m/s
Passenger capacity per a cabin: 166
The largest in Japan.
Cabins: 2
Stations: 2
Duration of one-way trip: 7 minutes

See also
List of aerial lifts in Japan

External links
 Another Ropeway in Japan: Kinosaki Onsen Ropeway
 Official website

Aerial tramways in Japan
1991 establishments in Japan